Marriage dispute may refer to disagreements, often legal, regarding marriage. Disputes may be personal, familial, cultural or social, religious, legal, political, as well as regarding individual marriages and their details.

Arranged marriage
Child marriage
Divorce
Endogamy and exogamy
Engagement
Forced marriage
Incest taboo (affinity (law))
Interfaith marriage
Interracial marriage
Marriage law
Annulment
Civil marriage
Polygamy and monogamy
Polyandry
Polygyny)
Same-sex marriage